Post-evangelicalism is a movement of former adherents of evangelicalism, sometimes linked with the emerging church phenomenon, but including a variety of people who have distanced themselves from mainstream evangelical Christianity for theological, political, or cultural reasons. Most who describe themselves as post-evangelical are still adherents of the Christian faith in some form.

Origin of the term 
While the origin of the term post-evangelical is uncertain, it was brought into broad usage by Dave Tomlinson and through his 1995 book of the same name.  Tomlinson has said that he first heard the term from a friend, although he "suspect[ed] the term had entered our consciousness surreptitiously a couple of years earlier."  In his usage of the term, Tomlinson argues that evangelicalism is a response to modernism, no longer appropriate in a post modern world.

Criticisms of evangelicalism 

Some post-evangelical criticisms of the evangelical church include but are not limited to:
 Individualism, pursuit of tangible success as a sign of spiritual maturity, and a consequently underdeveloped ecclesiology
 Politicization of Christian doctrine; "theologization" of political ideology
 Ethnocentric, especially Americentric, bias in theology, often in conjunction with nationalistic or exceptionalist politics
 General lack of positive engagement with the social and natural sciences, music, art, philosophy, news media, and other expressions of culture
 Materialist and consumerist lifestyles, as well as the strong promotion of capitalist economics and neoconservative (in the United States, Republican) politics as quasi-religious obligations due to the influence of the Christian right
 Strong opposition from Reformational traditions, particularly Calvinism, to developments in biblical theology (such as the New Perspective on Paul)
 Denominationalism and resistance to ecumenical efforts

Other definitions 
Christianity Today explains that post-evangelicals have become willingly disassociated with the mainstream evangelical belief system over difficulties with any combination of at least the following issues:
Questions over biblical inerrancy. Questions may relate to the biblical record of history, contradictions between scientific and scriptural explanations of the nature of the universe and humanity (e.g., the origin of the universe, homosexuality) or the discrepancies in descriptions of the personality of God in the different books of the Bible. Shrouding these issues are considerations about how the cultural understandings and linguistical limitations of the written word have influenced the way Scripture has been recorded and used.
Jesus versus Paul - Some post-evangelicals express concern over the role that the Apostle Paul of Tarsus played in the formation of the earliest Christian Church.
The moral failure of prominent evangelical leaders.
Many post-evangelicals have come of age during times of increasing multi-cultural awareness in Western society. They are presented with the educational lessons of the validity of all cultures and necessity for a pluralistic world-view. Tension exists between religious pluralism and the evangelical message of Christianity.
Questions of the role of women in church and society and the model of Christian marriage as taught in many evangelical churches.

Publications 

Publications identifying as post-evangelical include Recovering Evangelical, an online news and opinion portal for "evangelicals, post-evangelicals and those outside the church who still like Jesus", the blog Internet Monk, and Patrol Magazine.

Dave Tomlinson's book The Post Evangelical and Graham Cray's The Post Evangelical Debate are useful texts for understanding the movement and the debate surrounding it.

See also 

 Atonement in Christianity
 Constructive theology
 New Monasticism
 Open evangelical
 Paleo-orthodoxy
 Postdenominationalism
 Postliberal theology

References 

Christian terminology
Evangelical movement
Christianity in the late modern period